Pediasia radicivitta is a moth in the family Crambidae. It was described by Ivan Nikolayevich Filipjev in 1927. It is found in Russia (Minussinsk, Urga) and Mongolia.

References

Crambini
Moths described in 1927
Moths of Asia